James Allen Waskiewicz (born February 10, 1944) is a former American football linebacker and center in the American Football League (AFL) and the National Football League (NFL). A fourth-round selection (29th overall pick) of the 1966 AFL Draft out of Wichita State University, Waskiewicz played for the AFL's New York Jets (1966–1967) and the NFL's Atlanta Falcons (1969)

References

1944 births
Living people
American football centers
American football linebackers
Atlanta Falcons players
New York Jets players
Wichita State Shockers football players
Players of American football from Milwaukee
American Football League players